= Caucauses =

Caucauses is a misspelling and may refer to:

- Caucasus, a geographic region
- Caucuses, political events
